Awakkule is a Native American mythological figure of the Plains Indians Crow Nation people. It is described as an imp who can both assist people, or alternately play harmless pranks on them.

References

Crow mythology
Legendary creatures of the indigenous peoples of North America